Catharina Felser (born 2 October 1982) is a German race car driver born in Siegburg, North Rhine-Westphalia. Catharina started her career in karting during 1997, moving up to Austrian Formula Ford in 2000. Her performances there resulted in one race in German Formula Ford, also during 2000. In 2001, she competed in German Formula BMW.

Felser continued to advance her career, stepping up to German Formula Three in 2002, driving for the van Amersfoort and KMS teams. She moved to the Trella team in 2003 before leaving the series and single-seater racing in 2004, joining the German Seat Leon Cupra Cup to drive the number 16 car.

In 2008 Catharina Felser is driving a KTM X-Bow in the FIA GT4 for Team Reiter Engineering.

References

 F3-Cup: Catharina Felser im Cockpit bei Klaus Trella
 Catharina Felser official site
 Catharina Felser page on GT4Cup.com
 Driver for Reiter Engineering

1982 births
Living people
People from Siegburg
Sportspeople from Cologne (region)
German racing drivers
German female racing drivers
Racing drivers from North Rhine-Westphalia